Vantage may refer to:

Places 
Vantage, Saskatchewan, Canada
Vantage, Washington, United States

Aircraft 
Vantage Airport Group, an airport management company
VisionAire Vantage, a prototype single-engine jet aircraft built by Scaled Composites
Superior Air Parts Vantage, an American aircraft engine design
Vantage Club, a frequent flyer program for Monarch Airlines
Vantage, a flat-bed, business-class airline seat developed by James Thompson

Other uses 
Aston Martin Vantage, an automobile manufactured by Aston Martin
Vantage (cigarette), a cigarette brand manufactured by R.J. Reynolds Tobacco Company
Vantage Guitars, a guitar brand manufactured by Matsumoku
Vantage Championship, a 1986 golf tournament
Vantage Magazine, a publication at Crystal Springs Uplands School in Hillsborough, California
Vantage Specialty Chemicals, a specialty chemicals company
Vantage, a playable character in the game Apex Legends

See also
Vantage point (disambiguation)